Alexis Sánchez is a Chilean professional footballer who represents the Chile national team as a striker.  Nicknamed El Niño Maravilla ("The Boy Wonder"), he made his debut for his country in a 1–0 victory over New Zealand in April 2006. His first international goal came on his eighth appearance for Chile when he scored Chile's only goal in a 1–2 defeat to Switzerland in a friendly tournament in Vienna. , Sánchez is his country's top scorer and has the most caps, with 50 goals in 152 appearances. He passed the previous record of 37 goals, held by Marcelo Salas, when he scored the opener against Germany in the group stage of the 2017 FIFA Confederations Cup in June 2017. Sánchez's most recent goal came against Qatar in a 2–2 friendly draw. Despite Sánchez scoring seven goals, making him second-equal top scorer in 2018 FIFA World Cup qualifying (along with Lionel Messi, Gabriel Jesus and Felipe Caicedo), Chile failed to qualify for the finals. Sánchez made his most recent and 152nd appearance for Chile in a 0–0 friendly draw against Slovakia in November 2022.

, Sánchez has not scored an international hat-trick, but has scored twice in a match on ten occasions. Sánchez has scored more goals in friendlies and FIFA World Cup qualifying matches than in any other format, with twenty in each. He has scored two goals in FIFA World Cup finals, seven in the Copa América and one in the Confederations Cup. He has scored more goals against Uruguay and Bolivia (six each) than any other nation, and more times at the Estadio Nacional de Chile (ten) than any other stadium.

Goals
As of 27 September 2022
Scores and results list Chile's goal tally first.

Statistics

See also 
 List of men's footballers with 50 or more international goals
 List of top international men's football goal scorers by country
 List of men's footballers with 100 or more international caps

References

Sanchez, Alexis
Chile national football team records and statistics